Bir Man Chaudhari() is a Nepalese politician, belonging to the Communist Party of Nepal (Maoist) and current  Member of Sudurpaschim Provincial Assembly. In the 2008 Constituent Assembly election he was elected from the Kailali-3 constituency, winning 19739 votes.

Electorate History
He was elected to the  Member of Provincial Assembly of Sudurpashchim Province from Kailali 3(A).He contested and won Member of Constituent Assembly of Nepal from Kailali 3.

2017 Nepalese provincial elections

Kailali 3(A)

2008 Nepalese Constituent Assembly election

Kailali 3

See also
 Provincial Assembly of Sudurpashchim Province
Kailali 3 (constituency)

References

Living people
Communist Party of Nepal (Maoist Centre) politicians
Nepalese atheists
Year of birth missing (living people)

Members of the 1st Nepalese Constituent Assembly